The International Laboratory Accreditation Cooperation or ILAC started as a conference in 1977 with the aim of developing international cooperation for facilitating trade by promotion of the acceptance of accredited test and calibration results. In 1996, ILAC became a formal cooperation with a charter to establish a network of mutual recognition agreements among accreditation bodies that would fulfil this aim.

The ultimate aim of the ILAC is increased use and acceptance by industry as well as government of the results from accredited laboratories, including results from laboratories in other countries. In this way, the free-trade goal of a 'product tested once and accepted everywhere' can be realised.

See also 
 Accreditation
 Good laboratory practice (GLP)
 Institute for Reference Materials and Measurements (IRMM)
 International Federation of Clinical Chemistry and Laboratory Medicine
 ISO/IEC 17025
 Joint Committee for Traceability in Laboratory Medicine
 Reference range
 Reference values

External links
International Laboratory Accreditation Cooperation (ILAC)
ILAC Mutual Recognition Arrangement (ILAC MRA)
ISO/IEC 17025 Resource Center

Standards organisations in Australia